Acacia adinophylla is a shrub belonging to the genus Acacia and the subgenus Phyllodineae. It is native to a small area in the Goldfields region of Western Australia.

Ecology
It blooms from September to November and produces yellow flowers.

See also
List of Acacia species

References

adinophylla
Acacias of Western Australia
Plants described in 1999
Taxa named by Bruce Maslin